Easter is a song from English neo-progressive rock band Marillion's 1989 album Seasons End, which became a UK Top 40 hit when issued as a single in 1990. Allmusic describe the song as "heartfelt" with an "imaginative electric-acoustic arrangement". As with many Marillion songs, the album version features an extended guitar solo by Steve Rothery, which has become a fan-favourite, although it is heavily edited for the single version. The song was written by singer Steve Hogarth before he joined the band in 1989 and was inspired by The Troubles in Northern Ireland. The title is in reference to Easter 1916 by William Butler Yeats. Portions of the video were filmed on the Giants Causeway.

Track listing

7" and cassette version
Side 1
"Easter" (7" edit) – 4:29
Side 2
"The Release" - 3:39

12" version
Side 1
"Easter" - 5:58
Side 2
"The Release" - 3:39
"The Uninvited Guest" (live) - 4:44

12" version 2
Side 1
"Easter" (7" edit) – 4:29
"The Uninvited Guest" (live) - 4:44
Side 2
"Warm Wet Circles" (live) - 5:40
"That Time of Night" (live) - 4:36
A later "limited edition" 12" pressing replaced "The Uninvited Guest" with "The Release"

CD version
"Easter" - 5:58
"The Release" - 3:39
"The Uninvited Guest" (live) - 4:44

Chart positions

Personnel
Steve Hogarth - vocals
Steve Rothery - guitars
Mark Kelly - keyboards
Pete Trewavas - bass
Ian Mosley - drums

External links
Background information on the development of "Easter" www.theeuropeans.co.uk

References

Marillion songs
1990 singles
Songs about The Troubles (Northern Ireland)
1989 songs
EMI Records singles
Songs written by Steve Rothery
Rock ballads
Songs written by Steve Hogarth
Songs written by Mark Kelly (keyboardist)
Songs written by Ian Mosley
Songs written by Pete Trewavas